Boussens is a commune in the Haute-Garonne department in southwestern France.

Geography
The commune is bordered by four other communes: Martres-Tolosane to the north, Le Fréchet to the northwest, Mancioux to the southwest, and finally by Roquefort-sur-Garonne across the river Garonne to the east.

The river Garonne flows through the commune, forming a border with Roquefort-sur-Garonne.

Population

International relationships
Bouseens is twinned with Boussens in Switzerland, and these two villages has similar name, and become a sister city in 1987.

Transport
Boussens station has rail connections to Toulouse, Pau and Tarbes.

See also
Communes of the Haute-Garonne department

References

Communes of Haute-Garonne
Comminges